Summer Hill is one of the main localities of Shimla, the state capital of Himachal Pradesh at a height of 2,123 meters. It is on a hill, 5 km west to the Shimla Ridge, and is part of the seven-hill cluster.

History
In the past, Summer Hill has offered residence to Mahatma Gandhi, who stayed here at the Georgian mansion of Rajkumari Amrit Kaur during his Shimla visits.  Also known as the Potter's Hill, these pine and deodar laden slopes have many quaint residences, like one belonging to the family of noted painter Amrita Shergil (1913-1941).

Today
Besides being a popular tourist destination, the Indian Institute of Advanced Study (established 1965), housed in the former Viceregal Lodge, which was built in 1884–88, is on the nearby Observatory Hill.

Today, it hosts the Himachal Pradesh University, which mainly offers post graduate programmes in Humanities, Commerce, Science, Management, Law and Languages, and was started in 1975. Most students walk to the Hill Station of Shimla from the campus, though Summer Hill lies on the Kalka-Shimla Railway line.

References

Shimla Details

Tourist attractions in Shimla
Mountain railways in India